The 2020–21 Thai League 2 is the 23nd season of the Thai League 2, the second-tier professional league for Thailand's association football clubs, since its establishment in 1997, also known as M-150 Championship due to the sponsorship deal with M-150. A total of 18 teams will compete in the league. The season began on 14 February 2020 and is scheduled to conclude on 31 March 2021.

For this season two teams in the final table (champion and runner up) directly promoted to Thai League 1 next season while teams ranked 3rd - 6th qualified in play off for last spot in top tier next season.

The 1st transfer window is from 19 November 2019 to 10 February 2020 while the 2nd transfer window is from 15 June 2020 to 12 July 2020.

Team changes
The following teams have changed division since the 2019 season.

To Thai League 2

 Khon Kaen United
 Nakhon Pathom United
 Phrae United
 Ranong United

 Chainat Hornbill
 Chiangmai

From Thai League 2

 BG Pathum United
 Police Tero
 Rayong

 Ubon United

 Thai Honda
 Army United

Renamed Clubs
 Air Force United was renamed and moved to Uthai Thani
 JL Chiangmai United renamed Chiangmai United

Teams

Stadium and locations

Personnel
Note: Flags indicate national team as has been defined under FIFA eligibility rules. Players may hold more than one non-FIFA nationality; Club dissolved during season would shown by grey background.

Managerial changes

Foreign Players
Players name in bold indicates the player was registered during the mid-season transfer window.

League table

Standings

Promotion play-offs

Semi-finals

Khon Kaen United won 5–2 on aggregate.

Nakhon Pathom United won 4–1 on aggregate.

Finals

3–3 on aggregate. Khon Kaen United won 4–3 on penalties.

Positions by round

Results by match played

Results

Season statistics

Top scorers
As of 31 March 2021.

Hat-tricks

Clean sheets
As of 24 April 2021.

Attendances

Overall statistical table

Attendances by home match played

Source: Thai League
Note: Some error of T2 official match report 3 March 2021 (Udon Thani 1–1 Khonkaen United). Some error of T2 official match report 31 March 2021 (Kasetsart 0–3 Nongbua Pitchaya).

See also
 2020–21 Thai League 1
 2020–21 Thai League 3
 2020–21 Thailand Amateur League
 2020–21 Thai FA Cup
 2020–21 Thai League Cup
 2020 Thailand Champions Cup

References

 https://www.siamsport.co.th/football/thaipremierleague/view/158048

Thai League 2 seasons
2020 in Thai football leagues
Thai